"Rei I", also known by the Japanese title  is the fifth episode of the anime Neon Genesis Evangelion, which was created by Gainax. "Rei I" was written by Hideaki Anno and Akio Satsukawa, and directed by Keiichi Sugiyama. It was first broadcast on TV Tokyo on November 1, 1995. The series is set fifteen years after a worldwide cataclysm named Second Impact, mostly in the futuristic, fortified city called Tokyo-3. The episode's protagonist is Shinji Ikari, a teenage boy who is recruited by his father Gendo into the organization Nerv to pilot a giant bio-machine mecha named Evangelion to combat certain beings called Angels. In the episode, Shinji tries, but fails, to connect with Rei Ayanami, a fellow pilot, who is close to his distant and cold father Gendo.

When it was first broadcast, "Rei I" scored a 7.2% rating of audience share on Japanese TV. The episode won popularity polls and was praised by critics, who appreciated the introduction of Rei's character and her mysteriousness. Scientific concepts are mentioned in the installment, which contains cultural references to DNA, nitrogenous bases and wave-particle duality. "Rei I" contains references to earlier fictional works as well, such as The Andromeda Strain and Sailor Moon. The laconic attitude of Rei's character has also been linked by critics to the Japanese socio-cultural situation, in particular with the generation born in the seventies and with a martyr complex. Critics analyzed Rei's home as well, comparing it to buildings of postwar Japan. Merchandise based on the episode has also been released by Gainax.

Plot
The episode opens with a flashback to twenty-two days before. Rei Ayanami, the pilot of a giant mecha named Evangelion, is subjected with her Unit 00 to a test by operatives of the special agency Nerv. During the test, Eva-00 malfunctions, smashing the walls and windows of the room before eventually coming to a stop. Rei's cockpit is ejected during the emergency; Gendo Ikari, commander of Nerv, runs to open the cabin to make sure of Rei's status. The pilot, though injured, is still alive and conscious, while Gendo burns his palm and drops and damages his glasses.

In the present, Shinji Ikari, pilot of Unit 01, notices that Rei is always alone at school but appears to have a good rapport with his father Gendo, who instead is cold towards him. Shinji is tasked with delivering the new Nerv ID card to Rei and heads to her apartment. Finding the door unlocked and open, the boy enters, and happens upon his father's damaged old glasses, which Rei is storing on her nightstand as a keepsake. Being distracted by the glasses, Shinji is taken by surprise when he accidentally bumps into a naked Rei, who just had a shower, and ends up tripping and landing on top of her in a fit of panic. Rei does not flinch at the awkwardness of the situation, and proceeds to stoically ignore her colleague as he frantically tries to apologize and explain himself. Rei is later subjected to a new test with Eva-00, which is interrupted by an attack by a new enemy, the fifth Angel Ramiel. Shinji exits with Eva-01 to intercept the Angel, who fires a particle cannon hitting the mecha's chest. Shinji screams in pain as Eva-01's chest begins to melt from the heat.

Production

According to an official Neon Genesis Evangelion booklet, the fourth episode "Hedgehog's Dilemma" was once omitted in terms of the series composition and it was planned that "Rei I" would come after the third, "A Transfer". After the battle against Angel Shamshel, Shinji would become friends with his classmates Toji Suzuhara and Kensuke Aida in the third episode, receiving a call from them. As production progressed, however, staff members said they thought there was a need to depict Shinji's relationships with the people around him after the third episode. Neon Genesis Evangelion director Hideaki Anno was also stuck after writing the script for the first episode, "Angel Attack", which took half a year to complete, so he wrote "Rei I" and the sixth episode "Rei II" before the third and the fourth. For production reasons, the post-recording dubbing followed the same order.

In 1993 a presentation document of Neon Genesis Evangelion named  was released, with the basic plot of the episode already programmed. The Japanese title "Rei, Beyond Her Heart" was also planned. Akio Satsukawa and Hideaki Anno wrote the episode; Junichi Sato did the storyboards with the pseudonym of Kiichi Jinme, Keiichi Sugiyama served as director and Masahiko Ohtsuku as assistant director. Shunji Suzuki worked as chief animator, while Seiji Kio served as setting assistant.

Once the first part of Shinji's character arc was over in the previous episodes, the director decided to focus on Rei Ayanami in the two installments that followed. During the production, Anno encountered difficulties writing the character, not feeling "particularly interested" nor relating to her, but he thought of her as a representation of his unconscious mind. He also said that during production he forgot about her existence, giving her just a marginal space. In the fifth episode, explicitly dedicated to her character, Rei speaks seven lines and fifty-two words in the whole installment. Her storyline also changed. In the second draft of the scenario for the first episode, it was planned for Rei to rescue Shinji with an Eva. According to Neon Genesis Evangelion assistant director Kazuya Tsurumaki, the tentative plot would have given a valid reason for Shinji to choose to get on 01, thinking that Rei was hurt because of him, but the storyline was changed. A final scenario, in which Rei is injured during a botched Eva-00 test, was then considered. Moreover, the idea of Gendo's glasses being broken during the test was provided by Yoshiyuki Sadamoto, the character designer of the series.

While the scene where Shinji enters Rei's room was done in the style of Neon Genesis Evangelion, the scene where Rei is described as a normal girl was done in the style of Junichi Sato, who previously worked on the Sailor Moon series. In the meal scene between Misato Katsuragi, Ritsuko Akagi, and Shinji, Misato was represented taking inspiration from Usagi Tsukino, the protagonist of Sailor Moon. In the same scene, staff inserted graphic and humorous symbols on the characters' heads taking inspiration from the shōjo mangas and Sailor Moon. Furthermore, Sato tried to represent the scene in which Shinji is discovered in Rei's room by imitating the style of Leiji Matsumoto. He also wanted to add more details to the description of daily life, but Anno thought it would be excessive. Anno only gave the instruction to represent Rei's room as a "bleak room", and to represent it Akio Satsukawa was inspired by a flat he saw when he worked as a part-time plumber. It was easy for Satsukawa to write "Rei I", and the final product did not differ much from the initial draft he wrote. Jin Yamanoi and Yuko Miyamura voiced the unnamed Nerv technical operators in the episode, Koichi Nagano and Hiro Yuki played two boys from Shinji's school, while Megumi Hayashibara, Rei's Japanese voice actress, sang a version of Fly Me to the Moon used as the ending theme.

Cultural references, style and themes 
"Rei I" makes reference to scientific and biological concepts. During the incident where Eva-00 malfunctioned, for example, the Nerv use a special bakelite to block the Eva, named after the homonymous phenol formaldehyde resin. In the following scenes, Dr. Ritsuko analyzes the body of the fourth Angel, Shamshel, and its wave spectrum, finding it similar to the human gene. The words "pattern: blue" appears on her computer screen, since Angel's matter has a wavelength corresponding to that of blue light. On another screen also appears a map of human DNA, with the letters A, C, G and T, corresponding to the nitrogenous bases (adenine, cytosine, guanine and thymine). According to Ritsuko, the two maps are 99.89% matched.

Ritsuko observes that the composition of the Angels appears to have both wave and particle properties, just as light does; Neon Genesis Evangelion manga editor Carl Gustav Horn noted that the photons through which the electromagnetic spectrum is expressed have similar features. Writers Kazuhiza Fujie and Martin Forster similarly likened Ritsuko's statement to the wave-particle duality of quantum materials. In the same scene, a "code 601" appears on the computer screen, indicating the improbability of analysis. The code is a tribute to a similar scene from the science fiction film The Andromeda Strain, based on the novel of the same name by Michael Crichton.

In one scene, Gendo's glasses break and Rei keeps them with her. During the episode, the HLM neighborhood in which Rei lives is also framed, made up of identical temporary buildings. Critics compared her building to the danchi, the dense, cheap housing complexes that appeared in postwar Japan, and to the character's biography, noting she's a replaceable clone. Writer Dennis Redmond also interpreted the images of the high-tech laboratory, identified with Ritsuko, as a reflection of the social and natural history of postwar Japan. Critic and philosopher Hiroki Azuma described Rei's room as similar to a science laboratory, particularly a medical one. He likened the room to the Satyam, scientific laboratories of Aum Shinrikyō, a Japanese religious sect at the center of media attention during the broadcast of the series.

Assistant director Kazuya Tsurumaki pointed out the "distant, awkward communication" between Shinji and Rei on one hand, and Shinji and his father on the other in the first episodes, describing Neon Genesis Evangelion as a story about communication. In "Rei I", Shinji tries to communicate and establish a relationship with Rei, who is more emotionally attached to his father Gendo, but Rei refuses to open up to him and does not understand the meaning of his actions. In one scene Shinji sees Rei conversing with his father, smiling and jumping like a girl in love; according to Junichi Sato and Yūichirō Oguro, editor of some of the content of the Japanese home video editions of Evangelion, this could be an excess of the animators and a misunderstanding on the part of Shinji.

In another scene, Shinji tries to strike up a conversation on an escalator and in the process criticizes Gendo, for which Rei slaps him. Kazuhisa Fujie and Martin Foster noticed that Rei slapped him "in very much the same way a mother would react to a selfish child". Critics Brian Camp and Julie Davis described the escalators as a characteristic element of the series and of Anno's directional style. Writer Susan J. Napier, following critic Toru Endo, interpreted the descent into the base of Nerv and the images of escalators and elevators as a "descent into the subconscious". For movie critic Krystian Woznicki, the static mechanicalness of escalators is also reminiscent of the beginnings of the anime medium, when stories were to a large extent verbal narrations.

When Shinji enters Rei's room and he accidentally falls on her whilst she was naked, and in the process touches her breasts; the scene has been described as a criticism or parody of typical anime fan service. According to Christopher Kay from The Artifice, Anno uses such scenes to criticize the escapism of anime fans, who take refuge in a fictional and accommodating world. Carl Gustav Horn noted that the scene is "reminiscent of the most controversial one in Gainax's Honneamise", but "it's a eerie, mysterious scene, and erotic in a dark way rather than that of the 'cute' service shots". Mcccagora's Noah Black also compared Rei's behavior in the episode to the "psychological isolationist theory", where a person's emotions can be shown in extreme circumstances, but they otherwise present themselves as emotionless beings in groups of people so as not to stand out and draw unwanted attention to themselves. For Japanese reviewer Akio Nagatomi, her attitude reflects one of the traits of traditional Japanese society  the martyr complex  in which a person will do whatever it takes to accomplish a given task, regardless of personal consequences.

Reception
"Rei I" was first broadcast on November 1, 1995, and attained a rating of 7.2% viewership on Japanese TV, the highest up to that point. In 1996, the episode ranked fifth among "best anime episodes" by Animage magazine Grand Prix poll. Newtype praised "Rei I", describing the animation of the scene in which she smiles at Gendo as "excellent", while Digitally Obsessed's reviewer Joel Cunningham similarly lauded the installment, describing as a "pretty engaging" episode, "simply because Rei is such a fascinating character": "The cliffhanger ending, some mecha action, and some cute interplay between Shinji and Misato helps as well". Japanese website Merumo described Shinji's concern for Rei as one of the "highlights of the episode", and the scene in which Shinji encounters Rei after her shower as "famous". Critics also praised Rei's introduction and the air of mystery around her character. Justin Wu from The Artifice noted how in "Rei I" it is revealed that all records of Rei's past have been erased from the database of Nerv and this "generates the sense of mysteriousness surrounding the character"; Wu also noted that before Evangelion mysterious characters were people with a twisted and often tragic past, while Rei is presented as a girl with no past.

Animé Café reviewer Akio Nagatomi appreciated its introduction of new mysteries and interactions, as "the writing seems to deliberately try to pace this interest with the level of interest generated in the audience". In their book Anime Classics Zettai!, writers Brian Camp and Julie Davis described the scene in which Shinji and Rei talk on an escalator as an example of the "intricate geometric compositions" in which Neon Genesis Evangelion characters are often placed, praising the composition and the editing of the scenes of the series. Philosopher Hiroki Azuma praised the depiction of her room, saying that, "Rei's solitude is grounded in a completely tactile substantiality that gives us extremely realistic images of the discommunication that children of the present face". Animator Yūichirō Oguro also expressed appreciation for the character design, the animation and the work of chief animator Shunji Suzuki.

In the nineteenth episode of the Claymore anime series, Raki saves Priscilla from a falling block of bricks, ending up on top of her. Raki realizes he has his hand on Priscilla's breast, and then stands up embarrassed to apologize. The scene has been compared to the one where Shinji falls on Rei in "Rei I". The episode also inspired merchandise, including T-shirts and noodles.

References

Citations

Bibliography

External links
 

1995 Japanese television episodes
Neon Genesis Evangelion episodes
Science fiction television episodes